Sky Wings was a Greek charter airline that was founded in 2004 and started operations in June 2006.
Sky Wings was owned by Greek (51%) and Ukrainian interests namely Khors Aircompany (49%). In December 2012, Sky Wings suspended flights, passing its 
scheduled flights to Khors Aircompany.

Destinations

Sky Wings Airlines serves the following scheduled destinations (at August 2011):

Greece
Athens – Athens International Airport Hub
Ukraine
Kyiv  – Kyiv Zhuliany Airport
Lviv – Lviv International Airport
Odesa - Odesa International Airport

Fleet
, the Sky Wings fleet consists of the following aircraft with an average age of 15.9 years:

References

External links

Sky Wings Airlines aircraft
Sky Wings Airlines fleet

Defunct airlines of Greece
Airlines established in 2004
Airlines disestablished in 2012
Defunct charter airlines
Greek companies established in 2004